Preciosa is the luxury brand name for the range of precision-cut lead crystal glass and related products produced by Preciosa a.s. of Jablonec nad Nisou, Czech Republic.

Brand name and logo
The Preciosa brand name was first registered in Bohemia in 1915.

Products
Preciosa manufactures crystal glass in their own glass works. Preciosa crystal contains approximately 30% lead to maximize refraction. Since 2013 Preciosa also produces a lead-free crystal (lead content <0.009%).  The company has a range of colored glass and leadless crystalline glass.

History

The history of glassmaking in Jablonec region has been written since the 14th century.  In 1711 the Fisher brothers brought the secrets of crystal cutting and polishing to North Bohemia. During the 19th century, Jablonec nad Nisou became the world center of jewelry industry. In 1724, the first factory specialized in manufacturing and export of crystal chandeliers was established in Prácheň near Kamenický Šenov. Bohemian chandeliers were ordered for the Royal Courts—Versailles and Fontainebleau palaces of Louis XV, Sultan Osman III of the Ottoman Empire, and Empress Elizabeth of Russia.  In 1743 Czech master craftsmen created a marvelous chandelier in honor of the coronation of Empress Maria Theresa which still bears her name. 
The development of jewelry and glass companies, which were established and prospered in North Bohemia at the turn of the 19th century, was interrupted by World War II.

In 1945 the seven main crystal factories and 18 small firms in and around Jablonec nad Nisou merged, forming the Preciosa company. Preciosa was officially established on April 10, 1948.

During the Communist era (1948–1989) the history of the Preciosa company became one of close collaboration with the oppressive institutions of the Communist regime. In the period from the 1960s to the 1980s, Preciosa became an integral part of the notorious Minkovice labour camp (Věznice Minkovice) set up by the Communist government in 1958 and now known as one of the most brutal Communist prison camps in Czechoslovakia: it was nicknamed by prisoners “The Red Hell” or “Minkau” (after the Nazi concentration camp in Dachau). There are credible testimonies, by a number of political prisoners held in the camp in the 1980s, of prisoners being severely physically abused by some of the guards, including the notorious Josef Vondruška, to the point of torture; with the abuse resulting in permanent damage to the prisoners' health and, at least on one occasion, in the death of a prisoner.

According to a number of testimonies, Minkovice prisoners were forced to work in the Preciosa factory under inhuman conditions, suffering from lack of food, lack of breaks, unbearable heat, toxic work environment made worse by the lack of medical care, and they were constantly facing impossible work demands linked to threats of brutal punishment for failing to fulfil them, such as being held in concrete isolation cells for days and sometimes weeks. The profits of the Preciosa company under the Communist regime were thus due largely to the Communist prisoners' slave labour.

After the Velvet Revolution in 1989, in a less than transparent privatization process of the formerly state-owned enterprise, Preciosa was gradually bought up by Ludvík Karl, the Communist era manager of the company who personally benefited from the brutal exploitation of the Minkovice prisoners.

In 1993, the company Lustry Kamenicky Senov Inc., the largest Czech manufacturer of chandeliers and lighting fixtures became a daughter company Preciosa–Chandeliers, Inc.

In 1995  the subsidiary company Preciosa Figurky, Ltd. was formed in the Preciosa Group.

In 2009, the Jablonex Group divisions Glass and Beads joined in Preciosa Group as the new company Preciosa Ornela Inc.

Nowadays, Preciosa Group associates the following companies: Preciosa Inc.,  Preciosa–Chandeliers Inc., Preciosa Figurines Ltd. and Preciosa Ornela Inc.

Public activities
Preciosa is the main shareholder of the Czech football club FC Slovan Liberec. Preciosa was an official national partner of the FIS Nordic World Ski Championships 2009 and designed and made crystal trophies received by winners together with medals.

References

External links

Historia de Preciosa en Español
Preciosa History & Product Information

Glass art
Glassmaking companies of the Czech Republic
Czech brands
Manufacturing companies established in 1948
1948 establishments in Czechoslovakia
Manufacturing companies of Czechoslovakia
Luxury brands